The Domain Interaction MAp (DIMA) is a database of predicted and known interactions between protein domains. Version 3.0 of the database was released in 2010.

See also
 Protein domain
 Protein–protein interaction

References

External links
 http://webclu.bio.wzw.tum.de/dima

Biological databases
Protein domains
Protein structure
Proteomics
Systems biology